is a Japanese voice actress who is affiliated with I'm Enterprise. She played La Folia Rihavein in her first main role for the anime series Strike the Blood. She is known for her roles as Eriri Spencer Sawamura in Saekano: How to Raise a Boring Girlfriend, Ais Wallenstein in Is It Wrong to Try to Pick Up Girls in a Dungeon?, Vignette April Tsukinose in Gabriel DropOut, Miyako Shikimori in Shikimori's Not Just a Cutie, and Akari Watanabe in More Than a Married Couple, But Not Lovers. She won the Best Supporting Actress award and the Personality Award at the 12th Seiyu Awards.

Biography
Ōnishi began aspiring to become an actress in elementary school, while watching television. The voice acting performances of voice actresses such as Maaya Sakamoto and Sanae Kobayashi also inspired her to pursue the profession. During her elementary and junior high school years, she was part of a brass band club. Although she was part of the science class in high school, she decided not to join any clubs, instead preferring to attend a voice acting training school. Ōnishi began her voice acting career in 2012, initially voicing characters in a number of drama CDs, before moving on to supporting roles in anime. Her first main role in an anime was as La Folia Rihavein in Strike the Blood. In 2014, she was cast as Jamie Hazaford in the anime series Argevollen, Emi Murakami in the anime series Jinsei, and Kanon Chiyoda in the anime series The Irregular at Magic High School. In 2015, Ōnishi played Eriri Spencer Sawamura in the anime series Saekano: How to Raise a Boring Girlfriend. She played the roles of Ais Warenstein in Is It Wrong to Try to Pick Up Girls in a Dungeon?, Hisako Arato in Food Wars!: Shokugeki no Soma, and Miyuki Kujō in Shomin Sample. In 2016, she played the roles of Kazuha Shibasaki in Girlish Number, Non Toyoguchi in Keijo, Madoka Amano in Active Raid, and Ai Ninomiya in Amanchu. In August 2016, she visited Hong Kong to promote the game Ys VIII: Lacrimosa of Dana, where she plays the role of Dana. In 2017, Ōnishi played the role of Vignette April Tsukinose in the anime series Gabriel DropOut; she and co-stars Miyu Tomita, Naomi Ōzora, and Kana Hanazawa performed the series' opening theme "Gabriel Drop Kick" and ending theme "Hallelujah Essaim". She voiced Muramasa Senju in Eromanga Sensei, Marie Bell Breguet in Clockwork Planet, and Kuro in Restaurant to Another World. In 2018, she played Hiyori Jūjō in Katana Maidens ~ Toji No Miko, Ruka Irokawa in Comic Girls, and Beelzebub in As Miss Beelzebub Likes. In 2019, she played Nagi Kirima in Boogiepop and Others. She also played Kaori Shirasaki in Arifureta: From Commonplace to World's Strongest.

On February 22, 2022, she tested positive for COVID-19. She took a PCR test and went into quarantine after she was told that she was a close contact with someone with COVID-19. She is currently being treated with guidance from the health center and medical institution.

Filmography

Anime

Films

Video games

Radio

Kakuma Ai & Onishi Saori no Can-chome Can-banchi(加隈亜衣・大西沙織のキャン丁目キャン番地) - Niconico

7-Eleven presents Sakura toshitai Onishi(セブン-イレブン presents 佐倉としたい大西) - Nippon Cultural Broadcasting

A&G TRIBAL RADIO AGSON(A&G TRIBAL RADIO エジソン) - Nippon Cultural Broadcasting

Takamina to Onishi no Takanishiya(たかみなと大西のたかにしや) - Niconico

Dubbing
All of Us Are Dead (Min Eun-ji (Oh Hye-soo))
 The Loud House (Lynn Loud)
 The Casagrandes (Lynn Loud)

References

External links 
 Official agency profile 
 

1992 births
Living people
I'm Enterprise voice actors
Japanese video game actresses
Japanese voice actresses
Voice actresses from Chiba Prefecture
21st-century Japanese actresses